The Črni Kal Viaduct is the longest and the highest viaduct in Slovenia. It is named after the village of Črni Kal.

The viaduct was designed by Janez Koželj and Marjan Pipenbaher, who was also its constructor. The construction work began in 2001 and the viaduct was opened for traffic on 23 September 2004. When almost completed in May 2004, it served as a stage of the Giro d'Italia race.

References 

Road bridges in Slovenia
Viaducts in Slovenia
Bridges completed in 2004
21st-century architecture in Slovenia